Sinugra (also spelled  Shinoogra / Sinogra / Sinougra) is a village 7 km from the town of Anjar, in the Anjar taluka of Kutch district in the Indian state of Gujarat.

History
The village is one of the eighteen villages founded by Mistris of Kutch in late 12th century.
 The Mistris of these villages have built and developed the infrastructure around the villages in late 1890.

Geology
There is a limestone mine which located across the hill named Topi dungar behind the Sinugra village. Also the Sang river, which rises from this hill behind village serves the water needs of village. The river flows through other parts of Anjar taluka.

Heritage
The village boasted of 200 odd houses made by rich Mistri families, ornate facades, intricate door carvings and metal grill windows and verandah depicting life of Queen Victoria. There were also huge wall and Ceiling paintings depicting scenes from Mahabharata & Ramayana. The village like other Mistri Village was well planned by Mistris, who were master-planners themselves, having wide main roads and streets and other infrastructure, temples, ponds, wells and was unique in its heritage. Sinugra was known as Pride of Kutch for its unique artistic heritage.

However, most of it was destroyed in the earthquake of 2000. Sinugra Village being very near to Anjar also bore the heavy brunt of the quake and almost all old majestic houses built around 100 years ago were completely destroyed. There was also a good number of human casualty. Some of the old buildings, temples, Chabutro have been since re-constructed but the majestic houses with fine workmanship have been lost.

School
The village has primary co-educational school named Seth Khora Ramji Prathmik Shala built by Seth Khora Ramji and brothers in 1910 and therefore, has been named after him.

Temples
Kuldevi Temples of many clans of these Kutch Gurjar Kshatriya community are also there in this village. For example, Tank clan Mistri community have their Kuldevi Chamunda.

The Thakor Mandir of Sinugra built by Seth Khora Ramji Chawda, Pachhan Ramji Chawda, Teja Ramji Chawda, Akhai Ramji Chawda, Jetha Lira Jethwa and Khoda Ratna Tank in 1900. It is a remarkable piece of architect with beautiful and colorful carvings of Gods and idols. Further, Jadeshwar Mahadev temple also built by Seth Khora Ramji is worth seeing. The Swaminarayan Temple and Dharamshala are also in the village. A small temple of Ramdev Pir is also there in village. After the earthquake of 26 January 2001 all the temples and Chabutro have been rehabilitated to their past glory by donations from the Kutch Gurjar Kshatriya community.

Further, a mosque belonging to Mohammedan community is also there.

Present status
Villagers enjoy a good drinking water supply, and a steady electricity supply with few power shortages. Telephones are common, and nearly all of the houses have televisions and cable.

The village entrance has a big Chabutro and welcome gate.

Economy
Most of villagers are involved in agriculture, others go to nearby Anjar for their jobs and businesses.

Sarpanch
Dhamubhai Vadher, was former Sarpanch of this village. Newly elected Sarpanch, is Induben Umakant Vadher.

Census 2011
Sinugra is a large village located in Anjar of Kachchh district, Gujarat with total 694 families residing. The Sinugra village has population of 3077 of which 1577 are males while 1500 are females as per Population Census 2011.

In Sinugra village population of children with age 0-6 is 481 which makes up 15.63% of total population of village. Average Sex Ratio of Sinugra village is 951 which is higher than Gujarat state average of 919. Child Sex Ratio for the Sinugra as per census is 822, lower than Gujarat average of 890.

Sinugra village has lower literacy rate compared to Gujarat. In 2011, literacy rate of Sinugra village was 74.08% compared to 78.03% of Gujarat. In Sinugra Male literacy stands at 80.12% while female literacy rate was 67.89%.

As per constitution of India and Panchyati Raaj Act, Sinugra village is administrated by Sarpanch (Head of Village) who is elected representative of village.

References

Villages in Kutch district